The 2003 UCI Track Cycling World Cup Classics is a multi race tournament over a season of track cycling. The season ran from 14 February 2003 to 18 May 2003. The World Cup is organised by the UCI.

Results

Men

Women

References
 UCI archive
 Final Standings
 Round 1, Moscow Results
 Round 2, Aguascalientes Results
 Round 3, Cape Town Results
 Round 4, Sydney Results

World Cup Classics
UCI Track Cycling World Cup